Burrar Islet  is an island locality in the Torres Strait Island Region, Queensland, Australia. The locality consists of a single island, Bet Islet, also known as Burrar Islet.

Burrar Islet's postcode is 4875.

Geography
There is no infrastructure on the island.

History 
The island became a locality on 2 July 2010.

See also 

 List of Torres Strait Islands

References 

Torres Strait Island Region
Torres Strait Islands
Localities in Queensland